The Toronto Rock and Roll Revival was a one-day, twelve-hour music festival held in Toronto, Ontario, Canada on September 13, 1969. It featured a number of popular musical acts from the 1950s and 1960s.  The festival is particularly notable as featuring an appearance by John Lennon and Yoko Ono, as the Plastic Ono Band, which resulted in the release of their Live Peace in Toronto 1969 album.  The festival was also the subject of two films: D.A. Pennebaker film Sweet Toronto and the 2022 Ron Chapman film Revival69: The Concert That Rocked the World.

History and performers 
The Toronto Rock and Roll Revival was held at Varsity Stadium, at the University of Toronto, before an audience of over 20,000.  The originally listed performers for the festival were Whiskey Howl, Bo Diddley, Chicago, Junior Walker and the All Stars, Tony Joe White, Alice Cooper, Chuck Berry, Cat Mother and the All Night News Boys, Jerry Lee Lewis, Gene Vincent, Little Richard, Milkwood (Toronto-based Polydor recording artists), Doug Kershaw, and The Doors. Kim Fowley was listed as the Master of Ceremonies. Screaming Lord Sutch was later added to the bill, as was the Toronto area band Flapping. Prior to the addition of Flapping, the only local band on the bill was Whiskey Howl. The appearance of John Lennon, Yoko Ono and The Plastic Ono Band was not publicly known in advance.

Various mutually supportive performances occurred at the festival.  The Alice Cooper Band was the backing band for Gene Vincent, while a member of Flapping, Ron Marinelli, Danny Taylor, and Hugh Leggat a member of Nucleus, were members of the backing band for Chuck Berry.  In addition, appearances at the festival served to revitalize the careers of certain performers from the 1950s.  For example, according to one reviewer, in relation to Little Richard's performance:

The Doors, as the headlining act, closed the show.  The band's appearance at the 1969 festival would be their last appearance in Toronto, prior to the 1971 death of Jim Morrison.

Audio and video releases 
D. A. Pennebaker, who had made the 1967 documentary Dont Look Back, concerning Bob Dylan's 1965 UK tour,  and the 1968 documentary Monterey Pop, concerning the 1967 Monterey Pop Festival, also filmed the Toronto Rock and Roll Revival. The resulting documentary, Sweet Toronto, was released in 1971. As a result of Pennebaker's involvement, the performances of most of the artists were recorded and filmed. This has led to many authorized and unauthorized audio and video releases. Authorized video releases include the complete concert performances of Chuck Berry, Jerry Lee Lewis and Little Richard.

On September 13, 2022, Steven J. Bull debuted "The Forgotten Festival", an innovative multimedia documentary experience at The Royal Conservatory of Music. It featured a live band playing a selection of songs at the 1969 concert, Alan Cross and Steven J. Bull as co-MCs, and documentary short films featuring interviews with Alice Cooper, Klaus Voormann, Robby Krieger, John Densmore, Alan White (Yes drummer), Rob Bowman (music writer), and Peter Goddard (journalist). A 2023 theatre tour is being planned.

Performances
The following artists' live music performances were issued on album and cassette:

Chicago Transit Authority – "Toronto Rock 'n' Roll Revival 1969 – Vol. I" (Accord 7140, 1981)

Chuck Berry – "Toronto Rock 'n' Roll Revival 1969 – Vol. II & Vol. III" (Accord 7171/7172, 1982)

Alice Cooper – "Toronto Rock 'n' Roll Revival 1969 – Vol. IV" (Accord 7162, 1982)

Bo Diddley – "Toronto Rock 'n' Roll Revival 1969 – Vol. V" (Accord 7182, 1982)

John Lennon/Plastic Ono Band – "Live Peace in Toronto 1969" (Apple 3362, 1969)

References

External links

1969 in Canadian music
Music festivals in Toronto
Rock festivals in Canada
Music festivals established in 1969
Plastic Ono Band
1969 music festivals